Trey Phillips (born June 27, 1973) is an American former professional tennis player.

Phillips grew up in Austin, Texas and won state tennis titles at Westlake High School.

A three-time All-American at the University of Texas, Phillips went on to compete on the professional tour and was ranked as high as 154 in the world in doubles. He won one ATP Challenger doubles title.

Phillips now works as a real estate agent in Austin.

ATP Challenger finals

Doubles: 4 (1–3)

References

External links
 
 

1973 births
Living people
American male tennis players
Texas Longhorns men's tennis players
Tennis players from Austin, Texas